Aangan Terha was a satirical Pakistani drama presented by the PTV network in the year 1984. The show starred Salim Nasir, Shakeel, Arshad Mehmood, Durdana Butt and Bushra Ansari in lead roles. It was directed by Qaiser Farooq and written by Anwar Maqsood.

Plot and main theme
The drama is based on many stories on multiple issues of the society and indirect criticism of the Martial Law and the military regime in Pakistan and the electoral system. Many major Pakistani stars and artists played guest roles including the great comedians like Lehri, Moin Akhtar and Mahmood Ali. The twist occurs when the writer Anwar Maqsood appears near the end of the serial to inform the characters that the serial is about to end.

Lead characters

 Mehboob Ahmed, a retired civil servant, played by Shakeel
 Jahan Ara Begum, Mehboob Ahmed's wife, played by Bushra Ansari
 Akbar, domestic help of Mehboob Ahmed and Jahan Ara Begum, previously a classical dancer, played by Salim Nasir
 Chaudhry Sahib, Mehboob Ahmed's neighbor, played by Arshad Mehmood
 Sultana Sahiba, Chaudhry Sahib's sister, played by Durdana Butt

Guest appearances
 Moin Akhtar
 Lehri
 Alamgir
 Mahmood Ali
 Anwar Maqsood as Himself
 Qazi Wajid
 Azra Sherwani
 Shakeel
 Sultana Zafar as Maryam
 Latif Kapadia
 Asif Raza Mir as Bunty

References

Pakistani drama television series
Urdu-language television shows
Pakistan Television Corporation original programming
Television shows set in Karachi
Pakistani television sitcoms
1980s Pakistani television series
Pakistani television series endings